Storeria storerioides, the Mexican brown snake, is a species of nonvenomous snake in the family Colubridae. It is endemic to Mexico.

References

Storeria
Snakes of North America
Endemic reptiles of Mexico
Reptiles described in 1866
Taxa named by Edward Drinker Cope
Fauna of the Trans-Mexican Volcanic Belt
Mexican Plateau